Hluti is a town in Eswatini, located in the Shiselweni Region. As of 2005, it has a population of 6,763.

References

Populated places in Shiselweni Region